Brigadier General Mayen Ngor Atem is a South Sudanese politician. As of 2011, he was Minister of Agriculture in the Jonglei state government. He had also served as commissioner for Duk County.

References

Living people
People from Jonglei State
County Commissioners of South Sudan
Year of birth missing (living people)